Michael Robertson (born February 14, 1946 in Petworth, Sussex) is a former presenter of the ITV children's television  magazine programme Magpie.

Early career
He attended Midhurst Grammar School and trained as a teacher before working in a London play scheme. He then worked as a researcher for Thames Television.

Children's TV

He co-presented Magpie from 1972 to 1980, then went on to present an out of school activity programme called Freetime. When Freetime was dropped by ITV in 1985, he helped to establish The Children's Channel, where he presented a show called Roustabout.

Since the 1980s he has produced television programmes for children, including the series Wise Up and Blunt, and has won several Children's BAFTAs. In 2007, he was awarded the Special Award Children's BAFTA for his work in television. Accepting his award he said

Music
Robertson released the single "The Tango's Over" in 1974 and the single "Then I Change Hands" in 1975. An album also called Then I Change Hands was also released that year. None of these charted.

References

External links 
 
 

1946 births
Living people
People from Petworth
English television presenters
People educated at Midhurst Grammar School